Japan was the host nation of the 2020 Summer Olympics in Tokyo, originally scheduled to take place from 24 July to 9 August 2020 but postponed to 23 July to 8 August 2021 because of the COVID-19 pandemic. Since the nation's official debut in 1912, Japanese athletes have appeared at every Summer Olympic Games in the modern era, except for the 1948 Summer Olympics in London, to which they were not invited due to the nation's role in World War II, and the 1980 Summer Olympics in Moscow, as part of the United States-led boycott. The opening ceremony flag-bearers for Japan are basketball player Rui Hachimura and wrestler Yui Susaki. Karateka Ryo Kiyuna is the flag-bearer for the closing ceremony.

Japan finished the Games with 58 total medals, 27 being gold, an impressive improvement of the country's previous record performances from the 1964 Olympics (also held in Tokyo) and 2004 Olympics. This placed them third overall (for the third time after 1964 and 1968 behind the United States and China. By total medals, they also fell behind the Russian Olympic Committee and the United Kingdom. It was the most successful Summer Olympics in Japan's history.

Medalists

The following Japanese competitors won medals at the Games. In the by discipline sections below, medalists' names are bolded. 

|  style="text-align:left; width:78%; vertical-align:top;"|

|  style="text-align:left; width:22%; vertical-align:top;"|

Competitors
The following is the list of number of competitors in the Games. Note that reserves in field hockey, football, and handball are not counted:

Archery

Japan fielded six archers (three men and three women) at the Games, as the host nation is automatically entitled to use the men's and women's team quota places.

The host nation's archery team was officially announced on March 21, 2021, with London 2012 silver medalist Takaharu Furukawa slated to shoot at his fifth consecutive Olympics.

Men

Women

Mixed

Artistic swimming

Japan as the host nation, entered a squad of eight artistic swimmers to compete in the women's duet and team event.

Athletics (track and field)

Japanese athletes further achieved the entry standards, either by qualifying time or by world ranking, in the following track and field events (up to a maximum of 3 athletes in each event): The team will be selected based on the results of the 2020 Japan Championships and once an athlete wins a medal in race walking and marathon, or attains the top eight position in track and field at the 2019 IAAF World Championships in Doha, Qatar.

Four marathon runners (two per gender) were the first set of Japanese track and field athletes being selected for the Games, with a top-two finish of their respective races at the Grand Championship in Tokyo on September 15, 2019. By winning the gold medals at the World Championships, race walkers Toshikazu Yamanishi and London 2012 Olympian Yusuke Suzuki were officially added to the track and field roster. Suguru Osako and Mao Ichiyama completed the nation's marathon team lineup at the Nagoya and Lake Biwa Marathon on March 8, 2020.

Track & road events
Men

Women

Field events
Men

Women

Badminton

Japan as the host nation, entered thirteen badminton players for each of the following events into the Olympic tournament based on the BWF Race to Tokyo Rankings. The team was announced by the Nippon Badminton Association on 18 June 2021.

Men

Women

Mixed

Baseball

Japan national baseball team automatically qualified for the Olympics as the host nation.

Team roster

Group play

Round 2

Semifinal

Gold medal game

Basketball

Indoor

Men's tournament

Japan men's basketball team automatically qualified for the Olympics as the host nation.

Team roster

Group play

Women's tournament

Japan women's basketball team automatically qualified for the Olympics as the host nation.

Team roster

Group play

Quarterfinal

Semifinal

Final

3×3 basketball
Summary

Men's tournament

Japan men's basketball 3x3 team automatically qualified for the Olympics as the host nation.

Team roster
The players were announced on 3 July 2021.

Ira Brown
Tomoya Ochiai
Keisei Tominaga
Ryuto Yasuoka

Group play

Quarter-finals

Women's tournament

Japan women's national 3x3 team qualified for the Olympics by securing a top three finish at the 2021 Olympic Qualifying Tournament.

Team roster
The players were announced on 3 July 2021.

Stephanie Mawuli
Risa Nishioka
Mio Shinozaki
Mai Yamamoto

Group play

Quarterfinal

Boxing

Japan entered six boxers (four men and two women) into the Olympic tournament. Sewon Okazawa (men's welterweight), 2018 world bronze medalist Tsukimi Namiki (women's flyweight), and Sena Irie (women's featherweight) secured the spots on the host nation's squad in their respective weight divisions, either by advancing to the semifinal match or by scoring a box-off triumph, at the 2020 Asia & Oceania Qualification Tournament in Amman, Jordan. Three more boxers were officially selected by the Japanese Olympic Committee and the Japanese Boxing Federation to take up the host nation places for the Games, including Rio 2016 Olympian Daisuke Narimatsu in the men's lightweight division.

Canoeing

Slalom
Being the host nation, Japan has been awarded one boat each in all four classes. On October 20, 2019, the slalom canoeists were officially selected to the host nation's roster at the conclusion of the NHK Slalom International Cup, with Rio 2016 bronze medalist Takuya Haneda remarkably going to his fourth straight Olympics.

Sprint
Being the host nation, Japan has been awarded a minimum of three boats, with one each in the men's C-1 1000 m, women's C-1 200 m, and women's K-1 500 m. The men's K-4 500 m boat was added to the team roster with a top-ten finish at the 2019 ICF Canoe Sprint World Championships in Szeged, Hungary and the women's K-1 200 m with the fastest finish vying for qualification at the 2021 Asian Championships in Pattaya, Thailand. With the cancellation of the 2021 Pan American Championships and the lack of eligible competitors available from the Americas in the canoe sprint regatta, the women's C-2 500 m crew accepted a spare berth from the International Canoe Federation for the Japanese team.

Qualification Legend: FA = Qualify to final (medal); FB = Qualify to final B (non-medal)

Cycling

Road
Japan entered a squad of four riders (two per gender) to compete in their respective Olympic road races. Two of them filled out the places reserved for the host nation, while the remaining male and female rider earned a slot each by finishing in the top 50 (for men) and top 22 (for women) in the UCI World Ranking.

Track
Following the completion of the 2020 UCI Track Cycling World Championships, Japanese riders accumulated spots for both men and women in the sprint, keirin, and omnium, as well as the women's madison, based on their country's results in the final UCI Olympic rankings.

Topping the podium in the women's omnium at the 2020 Worlds, Yumi Kajihara became the first Japanese rider to guarantee a spot on the host nation's track cycling team for the Games. Five more members on the squad were named on June 4, 2020, with sprint riders Yudai Nitta (London 2012) and Yuta Wakimoto (Rio 2016) booking their spots for the second Olympics.

Sprint

Keirin

Omnium

Madison

Mountain biking
As the host nation, Japanese mountain bikers have already received a quota place each per gender at their disposal for the Games. The mountain biking team was officially named to the host nation's roster on June 5, 2020, with Kohei Yamamoto booking his fourth consecutive trip to the Games on the men's side.

BMX
As the host nation, Japan has already received four quota places each per gender per event at their disposal for the Games.

Race

Freestyle

Diving

Japan, as the host nation, is automatically entitled to places in all synchronized diving events, but athletes for individual events must qualify through their own performances at 2019 FINA World Championships, the 2019 Asian Cup, and the 2020 FINA World Cup series.

Five-time Olympian Ken Terauchi and his Rio 2016 partner Sho Sakai became the first Japanese divers to be selected to the squad after finishing seventh in the men's synchronized springboard at the 2019 FINA World Championships in Gwangju, South Korea.

Men

Women

Equestrian

Japan, as the host nation, automatically received a team of three riders in each of the three sporting disciplines: dressage, eventing, and jumping.

Dressage
Masanao Takahashi and Rubicon have been named the traveling alternates.

Qualification Legend: Q = Qualified for the final; q = Qualified for the final as a lucky loser

Eventing
Ryuzo Kitajima and Feroza Nieuwmoed have been named the reserves.

(s) – substituted before jumping – 20 replacement penalties

Jumping
Mike Kawai and As de Mai have been named the traveling alternates.

Fencing

Japanese fencers qualified a full squad in the women's team foil for the Games as the highest-ranked nation from Asia and Oceania outside the world's top four in the FIE Olympic Team Rankings. Rookies Masaru Yamada (men's épée), Takahiro Shikine (men's foil), Kento Yoshida (men's sabre), and Misaki Emura (women's sabre), with Nozomi Satō (women's épée) going to her third consecutive Games, secured additional places on the host nation's roster as one of the two highest-ranked fencers each vying for qualification from Asia and Oceania in the FIE Adjusted Official Rankings.

Eight more fencers were officially named to the host nation's roster on April 25, 2021, including Rio 2016 Olympians Kazuyasu Minobe (men's épée) and Chika Aoki (women's sabre) and American-born Kaito Streets (men's sabre).

Men

Women

Field hockey

Summary

Men's tournament

As the host nation, Japan men's field hockey team qualified for the Olympics by virtue of obtaining a world ranking equal to or better than thirtieth place by the end of 2018, or not finish lower than sixth at the 2018 Asian Games.

Team roster

Group play

Women's tournament

As the host nation, Japan women's field hockey team qualified for the Olympics by virtue of obtaining a world ranking equal to or better than thirtieth place by the end of 2018, or not finish lower than sixth at the 2018 Asian Games.

Team roster

Group play

Football (soccer)

Summary

Men's tournament

Japan men's football team automatically qualified for the Olympics as the host nation.

Team roster

Group play

Quarterfinal

Semifinal

Bronze medal match

Women's tournament

Japan women's football team automatically qualified for the Olympics as the host nation.

Team roster

Group play

Quarterfinal

Golf

Japan entered two male and two female golfers into the Olympic tournament.

Gymnastics

Artistic
Japan fielded a full squad of four gymnasts each in both the men's and women artistic gymnastics events, respectively. The men's team secured a berth in the team all-around by winning a bronze at the 2018 World Artistic Gymnastics Championships in Doha, Qatar, while the women's team claimed one of the nine spots available at the 2019 World Artistic Gymnastics Championships in Stuttgart, Germany. The women's team was named on 15 May 2021 at the conclusion of the NHK Cup. The full men's team was announced on 6 June 2021.

Men
Team

Individual finals

Women
Team

Individual finals

Rhythmic 
As the host nation, Japan automatically received a guaranteed place in the group all-around competition at the Games. One rhythmic gymnast was added to the roster by finishing in the top sixteen of the individual all-around at the 2019 World Championships in Baku. Chisaki Oiwa qualified an additional spot through the 2021 World Cup series. The athletes for the group all-around were announced on 2 July 2021.

Trampoline
Japan qualified one gymnast each for the men's and women's trampoline by finishing in the top eight, respectively, at the 2019 World Championships in Tokyo. Japan qualified an additional spot in both men's and women's trampoline through the 2019–2020 Trampoline World Cup series.

Handball

Summary

Men's tournament

Japan men's handball team automatically qualified for the Olympics as the host nation.

Team roster

Group play

Women's tournament

Japan women's handball team automatically qualified for the Olympics as the host nation.

Team roster

Group play

Judo
 
As the host nation, Japanese judoka have already received fourteen quota places (seven in each gender) at their disposal for the Games.

On November 24, 2019, Akira Sone (women's +78 kg) became the first judoka to be selected to the host nation's squad for the Games, following her triumph at the IJF Grand Slam Cup in Osaka. Twelve more judoka were officially named to the roster on February 27, 2020, with Shohei Ono looking to defend his Olympic title in the men's 73-kg division on the home soil. Meanwhile, Hifumi Abe trounced the reigning world champion Joshiro Maruyama to lock the men's 66 kg spot in a gruelling 24-minute playoff at the Kodokan Judo Institute on December 13, 2020, completing the host nation's judo roster for the rescheduled Games.

Men

Women

Mixed

Karate
 
As the host nation, Japanese karateka have already received eight quota places (four in each gender) at their disposal for the Games. With the cancellation of the last qualifying tournaments before the April 6, 2020 cutoff because of the coronavirus pandemic, World Karate Federation officially named the Japanese karateka to take up the host nation places based on the country's selection criteria. Among the country's karateka were three-time world champion Ryo Kiyuna in the men's individual kata and multiple world medalist Ayumi Uekusa in the women's +61-kg kumite.

Kumite

Kata

Modern pentathlon
 
Japanese athletes qualified for the following spots to compete in modern pentathlon. Rio 2016 Olympians Shōhei Iwamoto and Natsumi Tomonaga confirmed places each in the men's and women's event, respectively, with the former finishing fourth and the latter second among those eligible for Olympic qualification at the 2019 Asia & Oceania Championships in Kunming, China.

Rowing

Japan qualified two boats for each of the following rowing classes into the Olympic regatta. Rowing crews in the men's single sculls and women's lightweight double sculls confirmed Olympic places for their boats at the 2021 FISA Asia & Oceania Olympic Qualification Regatta in Tokyo.

Qualification Legend: FA=Final A (medal); FB=Final B (non-medal); FC=Final C (non-medal); FD=Final D (non-medal); FE=Final E (non-medal); FF=Final F (non-medal); SA/B=Semifinals A/B; SC/D=Semifinals C/D; SE/F=Semifinals E/F; QF=Quarterfinals; R=Repechage

Rugby sevens

Men's tournament

Japan men's rugby sevens team automatically qualified for the Olympics as the host nation.

Team roster

Group play

9–12th place playoff

11th place match

Women's tournament

Japan women's rugby sevens team automatically qualified for the Olympics as the host nation.

Team roster

Group play

9–12th place playoff

11th place match

Sailing
 
As the host nation, Japan has been guaranteed one boat for each of the following classes at the Tokyo regatta, bringing the maximum quota of 15 sailors, in ten boats.

At the end of 2019 season, the Japanese Olympic Committee announced the first set of sailors to compete at the Enoshima regatta, including multiple world medalists Ai Kondo and Miho Yoshioka in the women's 470 class and three-time Olympian Makoto Tomizawa in men's windsurfing. The 49er, 49erFX, and Nacra 17 crews were added to the roster on February 15, 2020, with windsurfer Yuki Sunaga and Laser Radial sailor Manami Doi joining them two weeks later upon the completion of their respective class-associated Worlds.

Men

Women

Mixed

M = Medal race; EL = Eliminated – did not advance into the medal race

Shooting

As the host nation, Japan has been guaranteed a minimum of twelve quota places with one in each of the individual events. Additionally, a shooter qualified for one event may compete in others without affecting the quotas, as long as they obtained a minimum qualifying score (MQS) by 30 April 2020.

Men

Women

Mixed

Skateboarding

Japan qualified ten skateboarder into the olympic competition. Six skateboarder (two men and three women) qualified after being ranked in top 16 based on the Olympic World Skateboarding Rankings List of 30 June 2021, and four skateboarder in men's and women's park events after winning the gold, silver and bronze medal at 2021 Street Skateboarding World Championships in Rome, Italy.

Men

Women

Softball

Japan women's national softball team automatically qualified for the Olympics as the host nation.

Summary
Legend: 
   

Team roster

Group play

Gold medal match

Sport climbing

Japan, as the host nation, received a guaranteed place each in the gender-based combined events, unless a maximum of two men and two women were selected to the team based on competition results.

Tomoa Narasaki and Akiyo Noguchi booked their spots on the host nation's team, with a successful podium finish each (gold for Narasaki and silver for Noguchi) in the men's and women's combined event at the 2019 IFSC World Championships in Hachioji. In November 2019, the International Sport Climbing Association (IFSC) and the Japan Mountaineering and Sport Climbing Association (JMSCA) confirmed Kai Harada and Miho Nonaka as Olympic-qualified sport climbers, occupying a place each reserved for the host nation in their respective events.

Surfing

Japan sent four surfers (two men and two woman) to compete in their respective shortboard races at the Games. Hiroto Ohhara and Shino Matsuda secured a qualification slot each for their nation, as the highest-ranked at the 2021 ISA World Surfing Games in El Sunzal and La Bocana. Meanwhile, American-born Kanoa Igarashi finished within the top ten of those eligible for qualification in the World Surf League rankings to join Murakami and Matsuda on the host nation's roster.

Swimming 

Japanese swimmers further achieved qualifying standards in the following events (up to a maximum of 2 swimmers in each event at the Olympic Qualifying Time (OQT), and potentially 1 at the Olympic Selection Time (OST)): To assure their selection to the Olympic team, swimmers must finish in the top two of each individual event under both the federation's required standard and a FINA-A qualifying cut at the Japanese Championships and Olympic Trials (April 3 to 10) in Tokyo.

By winning individual gold medals in the medley double (200 and 400) at the 2019 FINA World Championships, Daiya Seto became the first Japanese swimmer to be directly selected to the Olympic team for Tokyo 2020. Thirty-two more swimmers were named for the home-based Games at the end of the Japanese Championships and Olympic Trials, including backstroke veteran and double silver medalist Ryosuke Irie, leukemia survivor, freestyle, and butterfly sprinter Rikako Ikee, and the reigning Olympic champion in the individual medley Kosuke Hagino. For Irie, he became the third Japanese swimmer to compete in fourth consecutive Olympics, tying the record with Kosuke Kitajima and Takeshi Matsuda for the most appearances.

Men

Women

Mixed

Table tennis

Japan entered six athletes into the table tennis competition at the Games, as the host nation was automatically entitled to use quota places each in the men's and women's teams. Moreover, an additional berth was awarded to the Japanese table tennis players competing in the inaugural mixed doubles by advancing to the semifinal stage of the 2019 ITTF World Tour Grand Finals in Zhengzhou.

The host nation's table tennis players were officially named on January 6, 2020, with Rio 2016 bronze medalist Jun Mizutani participating in his fourth straight Games.

Men

Women

Mixed

Taekwondo

As the host nation, Japanese taekwondo practitioners have already received four quota places, two men and two women, at their disposal for the Games. On 9 February 2020, the Japanese Olympic Committee nominated the four athletes to take up the host nation places, with Mayu Hamada (women's 57 kg) leading them to her third consecutive Games.

Tennis

Men

Women

Mixed

Triathlon

As the host nation, Japan reserves four quota places with two for each gender in the individual and mixed relay triathlon events.

Individual

Relay

Volleyball

Beach
As the host nation, Japan received a guaranteed place for each gender.

Indoor
Summary

Men's tournament

Japan men's volleyball team automatically qualified for the Olympics as the host nation.

Team roster

Group play

Quarterfinal

Women's tournament

Japan women's volleyball team automatically qualified for the Olympics as the host nation.

Team roster

Group play

Water polo

Summary

Men's tournament

Japan men's water polo team automatically qualified for the Olympics as the host nation.

Team roster

Group play

Women's tournament

Japan women's water polo team automatically qualified for the Olympics as the host nation.

Team roster

Group play

Weightlifting

Japanese weightlifters qualified for four quota places at the games, based on the Tokyo 2020 Rankings Qualification List of 11 June 2021 and three quotas from Host Nation Quotas.

Men

Women

Wrestling

Japan qualified twelve wrestlers for each of the following classes into the Olympic competition. Eight of them finished among the top six to book Olympic spots in the men's freestyle (65 and 74 kg), men's Greco-Roman 60 kg and women's freestyle wrestling (53, 57, 62, 68, and 76 kg) at the 2019 World Championships, while two additional licenses were awarded to the Japanese wrestlers, who progressed to the top two finals of the men's Greco-Roman 77 kg and women's freestyle 50 kg, respectively, at the 2021 Asian Qualification Tournament in Almaty, Kazakhstan. Two Japanese wrestlers claimed one of the remaining slots each in the men's freestyle 57 and 86 kg, respectively, to complete the host nation's roster at the 2021 World Qualification Tournament in Sofia, Bulgaria.

Freestyle

Greco-Roman

See also
 Japan at the 2020 Summer Paralympics

References

Nations at the 2020 Summer Olympics
2020
2021 in Japanese sport